Claudecir Aparecido de Aguiar (born 15 October 1975), known as Claudecir, is a Brazilian former professional footballer. 

After beginning his career with Noroeste, he subsequently enjoyed a successful spell with São Caetano, before being signed by Palmeiras in 2002. Having struggled with knee injuries for most of his career, Claudecir had a decline in form after his first stint with the Azulão.  

Claudecir now has a social football project called Cidadão do Amanhã in Igaraçu do Tietê, and also plays for the Palmeiras Masters team.

Club statistics

References

External links

1975 births
Living people
Association football midfielders
Brazilian expatriate footballers
Brazilian expatriate sportspeople in Japan
Brazilian footballers
J1 League players
Kashima Antlers players
Expatriate footballers in Japan